The Borgio Verezzi Caves (Italian: Grotte di Borgio Verezzi), also named Valdemino, are a karst cave system located in the municipality of Borgio Verezzi, in the province of Savona, Liguria. They are a show cave.

Overview

Located in the outskirts of Borgio, the main town and seat of the municipality, the cavese were discovered in 1933. The touristic route, opened in 1970, is 800m long and counts some little lakes, due to the presence of a little river named Rio Battorezza.

The Valdemino are touristically defined as "the most colorful show caves of Italy", due to the presence of various minerals. Main colors are white, yellow, red and related shades.

Some prehistoric bone remains, dated between 500,000 and 750,000 years ago, have been found in various hollows.

See also
Toirano Caves
List of caves
List of caves in Italy

References

External links

 Grotte di Borgio Verezzi official site
Borgio Verezzi Caves on showcaves.com

Borgio Verezzi
Landforms of Liguria
Borgio Verezzi
Borgio Verezzi
Province of Savona
Tourist attractions in Liguria